Cəlilkənd (also, Jalilkend) is a village and municipality in the Sharur District of Nakhchivan Autonomous Republic, Azerbaijan. It is located in the left side of the Nakhchivan-Sadarak highway, 4 km in the north-east from the district center, on the Sharur plain. Its population is busy with grain-growing, foddering, vegetable-growing, beet-growing and animal husbandry. There are secondary school, cultural house, kindergarten, pharmacy, a medical center and House Museum of J. Memmedquluzade in the village. It has a population of 1,701. There are cyclops buildings of the 2nd millennium of BC (popularly called as qalaça) in the village.

Etymology and History
Under Russian rule, from 1870 through 1917, the village formed a part of the Sharur-Daralayaz uezd. In 1961 the village was renamed in honour of Jalil Mammadguluzade, the writer and satirist who wrote his first allegorical work (Çay dəstgahı) while serving as a teacher (October 13, 1887 – January 13, 1890) at the local school. The name of the village is a toponym memorial.

References 

Populated places in Sharur District